Curt Hahn (born April 21, 1949) is a filmmaker and entrepreneur best known for his feature films No Regrets (2004) and Deadline (2012). Hahn is a pioneer of intelligent independent filmmaking who works outside the Hollywood studio system.

Hahn grew up in New England and discovered architecture at Phillips Exeter Academy, enrolling in architecture school at Washington University in St. Louis. Filmmaking was his other passion and in 1970 he attended UCLA's summer session in film production. He never went back to architecture school, staying in Los Angeles to attend film school at the new Disney-endowed California Institute of the Arts. After getting his BFA in Film from Cal Arts in 1972 he worked as director of the film department for WTVI-TV, a PBS station, and as a director for Walter J. Klein Company, Ltd., a national film production company. In 1976 he moved to Nashville and founded Film House.

Film House

Film House has grown over the years to become the largest film and video production company in Tennessee and one of the largest producers of TV commercials in the US, moving into its  studio, editing and office facility in 1996. As CEO, Hahn leads a team of over 50 that produces hundreds of TV commercials and long form projects annually. He personally has directed thousands of commercials and longer films, featuring such performers as Candice Bergen, Teri Garr, Janine Turner, Garth Brooks, Amy Grant, Isaac Hayes, Reba McEntire, Shaquille O'Neal and Shania Twain. Film House has been a member of the select International Quorum of Motion Picture Producers (IQ) since 1977 and Hahn served on the Board of Governors from 1990-2006, including serving as IQ President from 1999-2002. During his term as President he helped guide IQ to the most financially secure position in its history, including the establishment of the IQ Endowment Fund. IQ is an invitation-only organization of some of the world's top film producers.

Transcendent
In 2003, Hahn founded Transcendent to produce high quality independent features. Drawing on the resources of Film House, Transcendent's goal is to produce the kind of inspiring, uplifting films that speak to the viewer's heart. Transcendent's first project No Regrets (2004), starring Janine Turner and Kate Jackson, was written, produced and directed by Hahn and released worldwide.

In 2006, Transcendent co-produced Two Weeks starring two time Academy Award winner Sally Field, Ben Chaplin and Tom Cavanagh, with writer-director Steve Stockman. The film was shot in Nashville. Worldwide rights were acquired by Metro-Goldwyn-Mayer which released the film theatrically and on DVD.

Next, Hahn produced and directed Deadline, starring Steve Talley and Academy Award nominee Eric Roberts. Deadline is adapted from Mark Ethridge's novel Grievances. Filming took place in middle Tennessee in January and February 2011. Deadline was released in theaters nationwide in 2012 beginning with its world premiere in Nashville on February 15. Deadline was released domestically on DVD and Video on Demand on July 17, 2012. Foreign distribution is handled by Curb Entertainment, which is releasing Deadline worldwide.

References

American film directors
English-language film directors
Phillips Exeter Academy alumni
Sam Fox School of Design & Visual Arts alumni
1949 births
Living people
California Institute of the Arts alumni
American chief executives
Washington University in St. Louis alumni